The Volunteer's Medal 1940–1945 was a Belgian war medal established by royal decree of the Regent on 16 February 1945  and awarded to Belgian and foreign civilians who voluntarily enlisted in the Belgian Armed Forces during the Second World War.  The medal could also be awarded to volunteers serving in the Belgian units of the Royal Air Force, Royal Navy or British merchant navy.

Award description
The Volunteer's Medal 1940–1945 was a 38 mm in diameter circular bronze medal.  The obverse bore the relief image of a soldier standing at ease holding a rifle with a bayonet, the soldier is superimposed over a large capital letter V in front of a rising sun.  The reverse bore the relief image of the Flemish "lion rampant" below the inscription in Latin "VOLONTARIIS", below the lion, the dates "1940" and "1945".

The medal was suspended by a ring through the suspension loop from a 38 mm wide silk moiré ribbon composed of fifteen 2 mm wide alternating red and blue stripes and two 4 mm wide blue edge stripes.

Notable recipients (partial list)
The individuals listed below were awarded the 1940–1945 Volunteer's Medal:
Baron Charles Marie Jean Joseph Elvire Ghislain Poswick
Antoine Maria Joachim Lamoral, Prince of Ligne, Prince of Épinoy, Prince of Amblise
Baron Philippe Robert-Jones
Baron Paul Halter
Lieutenant General Roger Dewandre
Aviator Lieutenant General Armand Crekillie
Divisional Admiral Léon Lurquin
Aviator Vice Admiral Sir André Schlim
Commodore Georges Timmermans
Count Charles of Limburg Stirum
Count Philippe de Lannoy

See also

 List of Orders, Decorations and Medals of the Kingdom of Belgium

References

Other sources
 Quinot H., 1950, Recueil illustré des décorations belges et congolaises, 4e Edition. (Hasselt)
 Cornet R., 1982, Recueil des dispositions légales et réglementaires régissant les ordres nationaux belges. 2e Ed. N.pl.,  (Brussels)
 Borné A.C., 1985, Distinctions honorifiques de la Belgique, 1830–1985 (Brussels)

External links
Bibliothèque royale de Belgique (In French)
Les Ordres Nationaux Belges (In French)
ARS MORIENDI Notables from Belgian history (In French and Dutch)

Armed Resistance 1940-1945, Medal of the
Military awards and decorations of Belgium
Awards established in 1945